Landstad is an unincorporated community located in the town of Lessor, Shawano County, Wisconsin, United States. The Landstad post office was established by its first postmaster, Sven G. Morgan, in June 1882. The community was likely named for Magnus Brostrup Landstad, a popular poet and hymnal writer at the time.

Images

References

Unincorporated communities in Shawano County, Wisconsin
Unincorporated communities in Wisconsin